Věra Janoušková (25 June 1922 in Úbislavice, Czechoslovakia – 10 August 2010 Prague) was a Czech sculptor, painter and graphic artist.

She studied sculpture during the 1940s at the Academy of Arts, Architecture and Design in Prague and the Academy of Fine Arts in Sofia. In the early 1960s, she was one of the founding members of the avant-garde art group UB 12.

Enamel objects are the most typical things, which Věra Janoušková brought in art.
At first she connected it by patinated plaster and then by welding of parts of old objects – pots, wash basins, stoves, plates, pipes, buckets, scoops, strainers or cans. She combines different methods – cuts and scissors sheet metal, welds and "stitches", works them by flame, uses opportunities of color contrasts.
She reaches delicate structured expression in compositions of simple shapes, crosses, totems and signs or pathetic figures. Thrown away objects gain a new function.

Bibliography

External links

 Věra Janoušková, artist Česká televize, 2005 
 Artwork: Figure  – Věra Janoušková Museum Kampa – Google Art Project
 Výtvarnické konfese: Věra Janoušková   Česká televize, 2008 
 Artist Věra Janoušková ARTLIST-  database of contemporary Czech art

Czech sculptors
Czech women sculptors
Czech women painters
Czech printmakers
20th-century sculptors
20th-century Czech painters
20th-century Czech artists
20th-century printmakers
Czech graphic designers
1922 births
2010 deaths
Czech women artists
Women graphic designers
Women printmakers
People from Jičín District
Czechoslovak sculptors
Academy of Arts, Architecture and Design in Prague alumni